The 1923 VFL Grand Final was an Australian rules football game contested between the Essendon Football Club and Fitzroy Football Club, held at the Melbourne Cricket Ground in Melbourne on 20 October 1923. It was the 26th annual Grand Final of the Victorian Football League, staged to determine the premiers for the 1923 VFL season. The match, attended by 46,566 spectators, was won by Essendon by a margin of 17 points, marking that club's fifth premiership victory.

The match was scheduled to take place a week earlier but was postponed because the ground had been flooded after heavy rain. As a result, this Grand Final coincided with the Caulfield Cup.

Fitzroy were the reigning premiers, while Essendon had not won a premiership since 1912. Essendon were known at this time as the "Mosquito Fleet" due to their large number of small and pacey players such as Charlie Hardy and George Shorten.

George Rawle made his VFL debut in the Grand Final.

Score

Teams

 Umpire – Alec Mutch

Statistics

Goalkickers

Attendance
 MCG crowd – 46,566

References
1923 VFL Grand Final statistics
 The Official statistical history of the AFL 2004 
 Ross, J. (ed), 100 Years of Australian Football 1897–1996: The Complete Story of the AFL, All the Big Stories, All the Great Pictures, All the Champions, Every AFL Season Reported, Viking, (Ringwood), 1996.

See also
 1923 VFL season

VFL/AFL Grand Finals
Grand
Essendon Football Club
Fitzroy Football Club
October 1923 sports events